The 1909 Auckland City mayoral election was part of the New Zealand local elections held that same year. In 1909, elections were held for the Mayor of Auckland plus other local government positions including fifteen city councillors. The polling was conducted using the standard first-past-the-post electoral method.

Background
Incumbent mayor Charles Grey re-elected unopposed. Grey had been elected by the council to fill the vacancy for the mayoralty remainder of the previous term following the resignation of Arthur Myers.

Councillor results

Notes

References

Mayoral elections in Auckland
1909 elections in New Zealand
Politics of the Auckland Region
1900s in Auckland